James Johnstone (born 17 January 1870 in Beith, Ayrshire – died 1932 in Liverpool) was a Scottish biologist and oceanographer. His studies focused on the food chain in marine ecosystems.

Biography 
Johnstone began his working life as an apprentice woodcarver in Lochwinnoch, but rose to become professor at the University of Liverpool heading the chair of oceanography which had been created in 1919 by professor William Abbott Herdman and his wife. James Johnstone a had this responsibility from 1920 to 1932

James Johnstone was a founding member of the Society for Experimental Biology (SEB). He was also active in creating the British Journal of Experimental Biology (BJEB) being on the journal's editorial board. În 1929, the publication changed its name to Journal of Experimental Biology

To honor his memory, a flatworm Rhipidocotyle johnstonei was named after James Johnstone.

Bibliography 
 James Johnstone  – British fisheries : their administration and their problems ; a short account of the origin and growth of British seafishery - London : Williams & Norgate, 1905. - XXXI, 350, 62 S.
 James Johnstone - Conditions of Life in the Sea. a short account of quantitative marine biological research – Cambridge University Press, Cambridge. 1908. .
 James Johnstone - Life in the sea - Cambridge, The University Press, 1911
 Johnstone, James, The philosophy of biology Cambridge, University Press, 1914.
 James Johnstone – The Mechanism Of Life In Relation To Modern Physical Theory - 1921
 Johnstone, James – An introduction to oceanography, with special reference to geography and geophysics - Liverpool,  The University press of Liverpool; London, Hodder and Stoughton 1923. In this book, he first used the term trench in its modern sense for any marked, elongate depression of the sea bottom.
 James Johnstone – A Study of the Oceans – London, Edward Arnold & Co, 1930

References

Biological oceanography
1870 births
1932 deaths
People from Beith
Scottish marine biologists
Academics of the University of Liverpool
Scottish oceanographers